The 2003–04 Honduran Liga Nacional was the 36th edition of the Honduran Liga Nacional. The season was divided into two tournaments, Apertura and Clausura, being conquered by Real C.D. España and Club Deportivo Olimpia respectively.

2003–04 teams

 Atlético Olanchano (Catacamas) promoted
 Marathón (San Pedro Sula)
 Motagua (Tegucigalpa)
 Olimpia (Tegucigalpa)
 Platense (Puerto Cortés)
 Real España (San Pedro Sula)
 Real Patepluma (Santa Bárbara)
 Universidad (Tegucigalpa)
 Victoria (La Ceiba)
 Vida (La Ceiba)

Apertura
The Apertura tournament was played from August to December 2003; Club Deportivo Olimpia and Real C.D. España qualified to the Final after they eliminated C.D. Marathón and C.D.S. Vida in the semifinals; once there, Real España obtained its 8th title under the management of Juan de Dios Castillo.

Regular season

Results

Standings

Final round

Semifinals

Olimpia vs Marathón

 Olimpia won 5–3 on aggregate score.

Real España vs Vida

 Real España won 4–3 on aggregate score.

Final

Olimpia vs Real España

 Real España won 4–2 on aggregate score.

Top goalscorers
13 goals
  Danilo Tosello (Olimpia)
12 goals
  Luciano Emílio (Real España)
10 goals
  Carlos Pavón (Real España)
9 goals
  Denilson Costa (Marathón)
8 goals
  José Pacini (Marathón)
  Pedrinho (Real España)

Clausura
On the Clausura tournament, C.D. Olimpia won its 17th domestic league by beating C.D. Marathón in the finals; Real Patepluma withdrew before the start of the regular season and were mathematically relegated to the Liga de Ascenso.

Regular season

Results

Standings

Final round

Semifinals

Olimpia vs Real España

 Olimpia won 5–2 on aggregate score.

Victoria vs Marathón

 Marathón won 4–2 on aggregate score.

Final

Olimpia vs Marathón

 Olimpia won 2–1 on aggregate score.

Top goalscorers
10 goals
  Luciano Emílio (Real España)

Relegation
Relegation was determined by the aggregated table of both Apertura and Clausura tournaments, the teams with less points at the end would be relegated to the Liga de Ascenso; however, Real Patepluma withdrew from the Clausura tournament due to a financial crisis and were automatically relegated.

References

External links
 Lina.hn–Official website
 RSSSF.com–Honduras 2003/04

Liga Nacional de Fútbol Profesional de Honduras seasons
1
Honduras